The 2021–22 season was the 33rd season in the existence of UD Almería and the club's seventh consecutive season in the second division of Spanish football. In addition to the domestic league, Almería participated in this season's edition of the Copa del Rey.

Players

First-team squad

Reserve team

Out on loan

Transfers

In

Out

Pre-season and friendlies

Competitions

Overall record

Segunda División

League table

Results summary

Results by round

Matches
The league fixtures were announced on 30 June 2021.

Copa del Rey

Player statistics

Appearances and goals

|-
! colspan=12 style=background:#dcdcdc; text-align:center|Goalkeepers

|-
! colspan=12 style=background:#dcdcdc; text-align:center|Defenders

|-
! colspan=12 style=background:#dcdcdc; text-align:center|Midfielders

|-
! colspan=12 style=background:#dcdcdc; text-align:center|Forwards

|-
! colspan=12 style=background:#dcdcdc; text-align:center| Players on loan to other clubs

|-
! colspan=12 style=background:#dcdcdc; text-align:center| Players who left the club midway through the season

|-
|}

Top scorers

Disciplinary record

References

UD Almería seasons
Almería